Lemanis Valley is a partly ice-free valley intruded at the entrance by a lobe of ice from Hatherton Glacier, lying between Ituna Valley and Lindum Valley and  west-northwest of Derrick Peak in the Britannia Range, Antarctica. It was named in association with "Britannia" by a University of Waikato (New Zealand) geological party, 1978–79, led by Michael Selby; "Portus Lemanis" was the Roman name for a port near what is now Lympne in Kent.

External links 

 Lemanis Valley on USGS website
 Lemanis Valley on SCAR website
 Lemanis Valley area map

References

Valleys of Oates Land